The 6 bore, also known as the 6 gauge, is an obsolete caliber that was used commonly in 19th-century black-powder firearms.

Design
The 6 bore is a  caliber firearm, used both as a shotgun firing shot and solid projectiles from muzzleloaders and breech loaders, both in smoothbores and rifled longarms. Late breech loaders were designed to fire cartridges. 

Three types of ammunition were supplied, hardened lead for elephants and rhinoceros, slightly hardened lead for buffalo and pure lead with a copper tube hollow point for lion.

History
Early 6 bores tended to be large muzzle loading shotguns that were used for wildfowling, whilst designed to fire shot experiences with dangerous game in Africa and India saw them loaded with solid projectiles, usually propelled by a double charge of black powder.

By 1850 the ivory trade was well developed in Africa and India, and muzzle loaded 6 bores were relatively popular, particularly for rifled weapons as opposed to smoothbores. As breech loaders and cartridge rifles came into vogue, the 6 bore's popularity faded in favour of the larger 4 bore, which became something of an industry standard, as it was a very popular choice of caliber for punt guns.

By 1880 conventional wisdom was the smaller 8 bore was a more practical caliber for hunting elephant, as rifles could be produced in more practical weights with more manageable recoil than the giant 4 or 6 bores. Despite this, 6 bore cartridge rifles and cartridges could still be purchased. The 6 bore was only made obsolete by the introduction of Nitro Express cartridges in 1898.

Prominent users
Sir Samuel Baker had a 6 bore made as his first specialist elephant rifle. This rifle fired a belted  spherical bullet or a  conical bullet with a charge of 16 drams (28.35 g) of black powder. Baker later wrote of this rifle:

"An extraordinary success attended this rifle, which became my colossal companion for many years in wild sports with dangerous game. It will be observed that the powder charge was one-third the weight of the projectile, and not only a tremendous crushing power, but an extraordinary penetration was obtained, never equalled by any rifle that I have since possessed."

Cigar, the 19th century hottentot elephant hunter who introduced Frederick Selous to elephant hunting, hunted with an old heavy 6 bore muzzleloader.

See also
 Gauge (bore diameter)
 4 bore
 8 bore
 .950 JDJ, modern cartridge of similar bore diameter

References

Firearms by caliber
British firearm cartridges